List of handball clubs in Spain sorted by division:

Men's

Liga ASOBAL teams
2015–16 season

División de Plata teams
2015–16 season

Women's

División de Honor Femenina teams 
2015–16 teams

 
Handball
Spain
Handball